Minima Moralia is a critical theory book by Theodor W. Adorno.

Minima Moralia may also refer to:
Minima moralia, an ethics book by Andrei Pleşu
Minima Moralia, an album by Chihei Hatakeyama